The 1971 Senior League World Series took place from August 16–21 in Gary, Indiana, United States. La Habra, California defeated Richmond, Virginia in the championship game.

Teams

Results

Winner's Bracket

Loser's Bracket

Elimination Round

References

Senior League World Series
Senior League World Series
Baseball competitions in Indiana
Sports in Gary, Indiana
1971 in sports in Indiana